Hamid Bouchnak (born 13 May 1969) is a Moroccan raï singer.

See also
Saida Fikri

References

External links
Official website
Official blog
Official YouTube channel

1969 births
Living people
21st-century Moroccan male singers
People from Oujda
20th-century Moroccan male singers

Discography

Albums CDs 
'91 Sá'lam Alikoum
'92 RAI Y
'92 ANA GHADI 
'95 MAROCAN'ROCK
'97 A.SHEBBA
'98 Houa Lawlid
'99 BLADI
2000 Ya Samra
2004 moussem
2008 HAMID

Singles
2011 Ma ngoul ma nesmaa
2016 Ifriqia Mama Africa feat Trevy Felix
2017 HIA HIA 
best-of:
2002 la nouvelle musique marocaine 'le meilleur' 3 CD's
2005 Rencontres & Inédits